Steve Sion is a former American bridge player.

Bridge accomplishments

Awards
 Fishbein Trophy (1) 1984

Wins
 North American Bridge Championships (8)
 North American Pairs (1) 1984 
 Grand National Teams (1) 1989 
 Jacoby Open Swiss Teams (1) 1993 
 Lebhar IMP Pairs (1) 1995 
 Mitchell Board-a-Match Teams (1) 1979 
 Chicago Mixed Board-a-Match (2) 1984, 1994 
 Wernher Open Pairs (1) 1990

Runners-up
 North American Bridge Championships (6)
 Grand National Teams (1) 1978 
 Reisinger (1) 1974 
 Spingold (1) 1984 
 von Zedtwitz Life Master Pairs (3) 1984, 1991, 1994

Sion-Cokin Affair

Steve Sion and his regular partner Alan Cokin were convicted of cheating in 1979. They were banned, though their American Contract Bridge League (ACBL) memberships were reinstated five years later. Sion was convicted of cheating again in 1997 and was expelled from the ACBL.

The cheating convictions make his bridge accomplishments suspect.

Notes

External links

American contract bridge players